The Dickson River is a river of the West Coast Region of New Zealand. It arises near the Dickson Pass in the Southern Alps and flows north-west. It joins the Tuke River and flows into the Mikonui River, which exits in the Tasman Sea near Ross.

See also
List of rivers of New Zealand

References

Land Information New Zealand - Search for Place Names

Westland District
Rivers of the West Coast, New Zealand
Rivers of New Zealand